Sobei is one of the Sarmi languages spoken in three villages (Sarmi, Sawar, and Bagaiserwar) near the district center of Sarmi in Papua province of Indonesia. Ethnologue (2005) cites two third-party population estimates of 1,000 and 1,850, while Sterner estimates the population at 1,500 (1975) and 2,000 (1987), based on actual residence in the area.

Phonology
Sobei reflexes of some common Austronesian etyma include  'hand',  'star',  'two',  'paddle',  'four',  'father',  'mother',  '(his/her) child',  'coconut',  'food',  'betelnut',  'water',  'leaf',  'up',  'down',  'breast',  'sugarcane',  'rain',  'man',  'one',  'three',  'sand',  'fire' (all gleaned from J. Sterner 1975).

Vowels

Consonants

Morphology

Nouns
Sobei distinguishes alienable possession from inalienable possession by directly suffixing nouns in the latter type of relationship, principally body parts and kin terms. The morphophonemics are often complex:  'my child',  'his/her child',  'our child(ren)',  'their child(ren)';  'my head',  'his/her head',  'our heads',  'their heads' (Sterner 1987). The following paradigm of the inalienably possessed noun  'father' is from Sterner (1976). The intermediate  before the possessive suffix serves as a plural marker. As an independent pronoun,  is 3rd person plural ('they'). Some kin terms that do not take the possessive suffixes nevertheless have plural forms ending in :  'uncle-PL',  'mother-PL',  'cousin-PL' (Sterner 1976).

Independent pronouns

Verbs
Sobei verb stems can include a number of aspectual, reciprocal, modificational, or directional affixes, but every verb is minimally prefixed to show the grammatical person and number of its subject and grammatical mood (realis or irrealis). Mood markers differ according to whether the stem is simple or complex, and some classes of verbs show stem allomorphy in their conjugational paradigms. (See Sterner 1987.)

External links 
 Paradisec has two collections of Arthur Cappell's materials (AC1, AC2) that include Sobei language materials.

References

 Sterner, Joyce K. 1987. Sobei verb morphology reanalyzed to reflect POC studies. Oceanic Linguistics 14:146-167.
 Sterner, Joyce K. 1976. A comprehensive look at Sobei phrases and words. In From Baudi to Indonesian: Studies in linguistics, ed. by  Ignatius Suharno and Kenneth L. Pike, pp. 153–176. Jayapura, Cenderawasih University and the Summer Institute of Linguistics.
 Sterner, Joyce K. 1975. Sobei phonology. Oceanic Linguistics 14:146-167.
 Sterner, Robert H. 1975. Sobei verb inflection. Oceanic Linguistics 14:128-145.

Languages of western New Guinea
Sarmi–Jayapura languages